A Mini-Research Module (MRM; , , MIM) is one of the two pressurised modules of the Russian Orbital Segment of the International Space Station. They are the following:
 Poisk (MRM-2)
 Rassvet (MRM-1)

See also 
 Research station